Charmeh is a village in Ayask Rural District, in the Central District of Sarayan County, South Khorasan Province, Iran. At the 2006 census, its population was 1,209, in 351 families.

Population 
According to the census of 2016, the population of this village was seven hundred and fifty seven people.

Economy 
The economy of this village is based on the cultivation of saffron, pomegranate and jujube.

Tourism 

Batoon cave 

Charmeh Garden

Plane tree of the Charmeh

Tomb of Pir Abazar

Gallery 

 cemetery of Charmah

Batoon cave

 Pir Abazar Tomb

 view of the village

 Garden of the village

References 

Populated places in Sarayan County